Ja'afar Tuqan (also spelled Jafar Tukan; (19 January 1938 – 25 November 2014) was a Palestinian-Jordanian architect.

Early life
Ja'afar Tuqan was born in 1938 in Jerusalem, Israel. He was the son of the Palestinian poet Ibrahim Tuqan, writer of the poem Mawtini, the current national anthem of Iraq. He was also the nephew of both the Jordanian Prime Minister Ahmad Toukan and the Palestinian poet Fadwa Tuqan and thus a member of the  Tuqan family.
 
Tuqan graduated from the American University of Beirut in 1960.

He worked upon graduating from AUB at the Jordanian Ministry of Public Works as a design architect, and then joined the firm Dar al-Handasah Consulting Engineers at their head offices in Beirut. In 1968, he established a private practice in Beirut, and in 1973, formed the partnership Rais and Tukan Architects, which later became Jafar Tukan and Partners Architects and Engineers, and was relocated to Amman, Jordan following the Lebanese Civil war during the mid-1970s. In 2003, Jafar Tukan and Partners Architects and Engineers merged with the Jordanian firm Consolidated Consultants for Engineering and the Environment.

Career
Tuquan designed the Municipality of Amman in Ras al Ayn in association with Rasem Badran, and he belonged to several committees including that of the National Gallery. Ja'afar Tuqan also designed the Royal Automobile Museum, The Jordan Museum, the Yasser Arafat Museum in Ramallah, the Mahmoud Darwish Museum in Ramallah,  the Central Bank of Jordan building and the Jordan Gate Towers. He was the recipient of the Aga Khan Award for Architecture for his 1991 design of a Children's Village - Aqaba, Jordan.

Tuqan served on the Board of Trustees  of the Palestinian Art Court – Al Hoash.

Death
Tuquan died on November 25, 2014, in Amman, Jordan.

References

Exhibition of Touqan's works at French Cultural Centre
 Spotlight on talent, THE STAR, September 29, 2003
Designed the Royal Automobile Museum 

1938 births
2014 deaths
People from Nablus
Palestinian architects
Ja'afar
American University of Beirut alumni
Palestinians
People from Amman
Jordanian architects
Jordanian contemporary artists